The 1957 Copa del Generalísimo Juvenil was the seventh staging of the tournament. The competition began on May 5, 1957, and ended on June 16, 1957, with the final.

First round

|}

Replay Games

|}

Second round

|}

Replay Game

|}

Third round

|}

Quarterfinals

|}

Replay Games

|}

Semifinals

|}

Final

|}

Copa del Rey Juvenil de Fútbol
Juvenil